The 1950 AAA Championship Car season consisted of 13 races, beginning in Speedway, Indiana on May 30 and concluding in Darlington, South Carolina on December 10.  There were also two non-championship events.  The AAA National Champion was Henry Banks, and the Indianapolis 500 winner was Johnnie Parsons.

Schedule and results

  Indianapolis 500 was AAA-sanctioned and counted towards the 1950 FIA World Championship of Drivers title. Race stopped after 345 miles due to rain.
  No pole is awarded for the Pikes Peak Hill Climb, in this schedule on the pole is the driver who started first. No lap led was awarded for the Pikes Peak Hill Climb, however, a lap was awarded to the drivers that completed the climb.

Final points standings

Note1: The points became the car, when not only one driver led the car, the relieved driver became small part of the points. Points for driver method: (the points for the finish place) / (number the lap when completed the car) * (number the lap when completed the driver) 
Note2: There were scoring omissions in the AAA records regarding laps completed for eight drivers in the Springfield and Bay Meadows races in 1950. The statistics shown include the most accurate representation of those races that is available.

References
 
 
 
 http://media.indycar.com/pdf/2011/IICS_2011_Historical_Record_Book_INT6.pdf  (p. 303-305)

See also
 1950 Indianapolis 500

AAA Championship Car season
AAA Championship Car
1950 in American motorsport
1950 in sports in South Carolina